The Norwegian Historical Association (HIFO) is a Norwegian historical organization.

The Association was founded in 1869 by Michael Birkeland and Ludvig Ludvigsen Daae. It works to promote historical research and to strengthen history  in higher education and in public. Its publishes the academic journal Historisk Tidsskrift, which it commenced in 1871. The association also publishes the magazine Historikeren. Additionally the association is co-owner of  Scandinavian Journal of History.

In 1990, the association merged with the organizations Norsk historikerforening (founded 1982) and Norsk komité for historisk vitskap (founded 1927). It kept its old name, but adopted the new acronym HIFO.

References

External links
 Den norske historiske forening website
Scandinavian Journal of History  website
Historikeren website

Organizations established in 1869
Organisations based in Bergen
Historical societies
1869 establishments in Norway
History organisations based in Norway